Drummin fort is a ringfort and National Monument located in County Roscommon, Ireland.

Location
Drummin ringfort is located 900 m (½ mile) east-southeast of Bellanagare.

History and description
Drummin Rath contains a pair of Ogham stones close to the southern part.

Ogham stones
This suggests *Kunowatīs, "dog prophet," and a 5th-century date.

Drummin II reads RAVASA KOI MAQQI D/T ...

References

National Monuments in County Roscommon
Archaeological sites in County Roscommon